George Albert Black (January 17, 1778 – 19 May 1854) was a Canadian politician and businessman and an important shipbuilder in Quebec during the earlier part of the 19th century.

References

Bibliography

1778 births
1854 deaths
Canadian Presbyterians
Canadian businesspeople
Canadian shipbuilders
Quebec City councillors